The Art of Mathematics, written by Hong Sung-Dae, is a series of mathematics textbooks for high school students in South Korea. First published in 1966, it is the best-selling book series in South Korea, with about 46 million copies sold as of 2016. In Jeongeup, North Jeolla Province, the hometown of Hong Sung-Dae, a street is named Suhakjeongseok-gil in honor of the author.'

Controversy 
The similarities with the Japanese Textbook series Chart-Style Math have caused the author to receive accusations of plagiarism. The chapter division, style of explanation, and formatting are visibly similar between the books. For instance, in the Japanese books, the order of questions are in "Example Questions, Practice Questions, Exercise Questions," while in The Art of Mathematics it is "Example Questions, Similar Questions, Practice Questions".  The author Hong has denied all accusations, although he has admitted that the questions in the books were selected from 20 reference books around the world.

Major topics in the 11th edition
Changes in the 11th edition, published 2013-2015, reflect the 2009 revision of South Korea's National Curriculum. Each of the six volumes consist of two versions, one for average students and one for higher-ability students.

Mathematics I

Polynomials (다항식 da-hang-sik)
Equations and Inequalities (방정식과 부등식 bang-jeong-sik-gwa boo-deung-sik)
Graphs of Equations (방정식의 그래프 bang-jeong-sik-eui geu-re-pu)

Mathematics II

Sets and Propositions (집합과 명제 jib-hab-gwa myung-jeh)
Functions (함수 ham-soo)
Sequences (수열 soo-yeul)
Exponents and Logarithms (지수와 로그함수 ji-soo-wa lo-geu-ham-soo)

Probability and Statistics

Permutations and Combinations (순열과 조합 soon-yeul-gwa jo-hab)
Probability (확률 hwang-lyul)
Statistics (통계 tong-gye)

Calculus I

Limits of Sequences (수열의 극한 soo-yeul-eui geuk-han)
Limits and Continuity (극한과 연속성 geuk-han-gwa yeon-sok-sung)
Differentiation of Polynomial Functions (다항식의 미분 da-hang-sik-eui mi-boon)
Integration of Polynomial Functions (다항식의 적분 da-hang-sik-eui juck-boon)

Calculus II

Exponential and Logarithmic Functions (지수와 로그 함수 ji-soo-wa lo-geu-ham-soo)
Trigonometric Functions (삼각함수 sam-gak-ham-soo)
Differentiation (미분 mi-boon)
Integration (적분 juck-boon)

Geometry and Vectors

Plane Curves (평면곡선 pyung-myun-gog-seon)
Vectors in the Plane (평면 벡터 pyung-myun beg-teo)
Graphs and Vectors in Space (공간의 그래프와 벡터 gong-gan-eui geu-re-pu-wa beg-teo)

References

External links 
  publisher's website

Mathematics textbooks
1966 non-fiction books
Korean non-fiction books